The following is a list of Polish officers holding the rank of admiral, as well as generals serving in the Polish Navy. Prior to 1918 the term admirał (and, consistently, wiceadmirał and  kontradmirał) referred to a function held in the navy rather than a military rank as such.

Until 1918
 admiral Ellert Appelman (See surname Appelman in Swedish Wikipedia). 
 admiral Wilhelm Appelman 
admirał Krzysztof Arciszewski
 admiral Arend Dickmann 
 admiral Grzegorz Fentross, probably Gregorio Venturoso 
 admiral Johan Nilsson Gyllenstierna  also Jan Guldenstern - see Gyllenstierna/Gyldenstjerne/Guldenstern in English, Polish, and Swedish Wikipedia.
 admiral Tonnson Maidel 
 admiral Michał Starostka, (also Michał Starosta) first Pole to be appointed admiral (1571), he was ennobled and entitled to Starostka coat-of-arms (1569).
 admiral Herman Witte  
 vice-admiral Aleksander Sitton 
 rear-admiral Jakub Murray 
admirał Michał Starosta

1918–1939
 generał brygady Tadeusz Bobrowski, chief of the Technical Service of the Directorate of Navy in the Ministry of National Defence
 kontradmirał Xawery Czernicki, chief of services and deputy commander of the Navy
 wiceadmirał Kazimierz Porębski, chief of the Naval Affairs Department of the Ministry of Military Affairs
 wiceadmirał Jerzy Świrski, commander of the Navy
 wiceadmirał Józef Unrug, deputy commander of the Navy

World War II
 generał brygady Stanisław Dąbek , commander of the Coastal Land Defence units
 kontradmirał Stefan Frankowski , commander of the Coastal Sea Defence units
 kontradmirał Tadeusz Morgenstern-Podjazd , deputy commander of the Navy
 kontradmirał Romuald Nałęcz-Tymiński , commanding officer of ORP Conrad
kontradmirał Józef Bartosik
kontradmirał Karol Korytowski
kontradmirał Leon Moszczyński
kontradmirał Jerzy Tumaniszwili

1945–1989 
 kontradmirał Mikołaj Abramow (Nikolai Abramov - commander of the Navy) , commander of the Navy
 wiceadmirał Wiktor Czerokow (Viktor Cherokov) , commander of the Navy
 kontradmirał Adam Mohuczy, deputy commander of the Navy
 kontradmirał Włodzimierz Steyer, commander of the Navy
 kontradmirał Iwan Szylingowski (Ivan Shillingovskiy) , chief of general staff and deputy commander of the Navy
 kontradmirał Aleksander Winogradow (Aleksandr Vinogradov)  – dowódca Marynarki Wojennej

After 1989 
 admirał floty Roman Krzyżelewski , commander of the Polish Navy
 Roman Krzyżelewski, commander of the Polish Navy 2003 to 2007
 kontradmirał Jerzy Tumaniszwili, a World War II hero
admirał floty Tomasz Mathea, commander of the Polish Navy from 2010 to 2015
wiceadmirał Andrzej Karweta, commander of the Polish Navy from 2007 to 2010.

Notes 

 
Admirals
Lists of admirals